Guy Epaud (born 21 September 1936) is a French racing cyclist. He rode in the 1963 Tour de France.

References

1936 births
Living people
French male cyclists
Place of birth missing (living people)